Gulnara Iskanderovna Samitova-Galkina (born 9 July 1978 in Naberezhnye Chelny, Tatarstan) is a Russian distance runner. In July 2004 she ran 3000 metres steeplechase in a new world record of 9:01.59 minutes. Early that year she won a bronze medal over 1500 metres at the 2004 IAAF World Indoor Championships.

Gulnara Samitova-Galkina is of mixed Tatar and Russian origin. She is a two-time national champion in the women's 5000 metres.

Samitova claimed the gold medal at the 2008 Olympics in the 3000 m steeplechase, breaking her own world record in the final with a time of 8:58.81 min, becoming the first woman in history to run under 9 minutes for the steeplechase.

She won both the 800 and 1500 metres races at the Russian Team Championships in June 2009, clocking a personal best of 2:00.29 in the 800 m and a world leading time over 1500 m.

She missed the entire 2010 season, including the 2010 European Athletics Championships, after she fell pregnant. She gave birth to her daughter Alina in June, and  returned to training that autumn.

International competitions

Personal bests
800 metres - 2:00.29 min (2009)
1500 metres - 4:01.29 min (2004)
Mile run - 4:20.23 min (2007)
3000 metres - 8:42.96 min (2008)
3000 metres steeplechase - 8:58.81 min (2008)
5000 metres - 14:33.13 min (2008)

See also
List of Olympic medalists in athletics (women)
List of 2008 Summer Olympics medal winners
Steeplechase at the Olympics
List of IAAF World Indoor Championships medalists (women)
List of 5000 metres national champions (women)
List of long-distance runners
List of Tatars
List of Russian sportspeople

References

External links

Focus on Athletes – in-depth article from IAAF

1978 births
Living people
People from Naberezhnye Chelny
Sportspeople from Tatarstan
Russian female steeplechase runners
Russian female middle-distance runners
Russian female long-distance runners
Russian female cross country runners
Olympic female steeplechase runners
Olympic female long-distance runners
Olympic athletes of Russia
Olympic gold medalists for Russia
Olympic gold medalists in athletics (track and field)
Athletes (track and field) at the 2004 Summer Olympics
Athletes (track and field) at the 2008 Summer Olympics
Athletes (track and field) at the 2012 Summer Olympics
Medalists at the 2008 Summer Olympics
World Athletics Championships athletes for Russia
Russian Athletics Championships winners
World record setters in athletics (track and field)
Tatar people of Russia